Hustle is Africa Magic Nigeria television drama, and comedy series starring Seun Ajayi, Sola Sobowale, Seyi Law, Stephanie Coker, Dorcas Shola-Fapson, Maurice Sam, Elvis Poko, Deborah Anugwa, John Joshua, Afeez Oyetoro, and Tobi Bakre.

Synopsis
Hustle tells the tale of Dayo (played by Seun Ajayi), a gullible but optimistic young man who moves to Lagos with dreams of making it big. Dayo quickly learns that it is never as it seems as he comes to terms with hilariously catastrophic neighbors, an antagonistic landlady, and a shady yet loyal roommate. All these characters nonetheless share an unwavering hope for tomorrow, and they are buoyed by the "Lagos spirit", the spirit of the hustle.

Cast
Seun Ajayi as Dayo
Sola Sobowale as Mama Sekinat
Seyi Law as Osere
Stephanie Coker as Cindy
Dorcas Shola-Fapson
Maurice Sam
Elvis Poko as Ochuko
Deborah Anugwa
John Joshua as Razaq
Tobi Bakre
Afeez Oyetoro

Series overview

Broadcast history
The show was premiered on 3 October 2016, on Africa Magic Urban. On 4 June 2017, Hustle began broadcasting on Africa Magic Family.

Awards and nominations

References

External links
 Hustle at Africa Magic

Nigerian television series
Nigerian comedy television series
2016 Nigerian television series debuts
Africa Magic original programming